Michael Mark Prisk (born 12 June 1962) is a British politician who was Member of Parliament (MP) for Hertford and Stortford from 2001 until 2019. A member of the Conservative Party, he was Minister of State for Business and Enterprise from 2010 to 2012 and Minister of State for Housing and Local Government from 2012 to 2013.

Early life
Prisk was born at Redruth, Cornwall and whilst living at Camborne was educated at Truro School in 1973–80. He went on to study Land Management at the University of Reading, gaining a BSc degree. From 1983 to 1985, he was Chairman of the Youth Section of Peace through NATO. He was vice-chairman of the Federation of Conservative Students in 1982–83.

After graduation, Prisk worked in property and economic development and rose to become director of a £3 million practice. From 1983 to 1985, he worked as a graduate surveyor for Knight Frank, then as development surveyor for Derrick Wade & Waters where he became manager of the London office from 1985 to 1989. He was a marketing director from 1989 to 1991, then principal of the Mark Prisk Connection from 1991 to 1997. From 1997 to 2001, he was company owner of MP2.

Parliamentary career
Prisk was Chairman of Cornwall Young Conservatives and after unsuccessfully contesting Newham North West in 1992 and Wansdyke in 1997, he was finally elected as the Conservative MP for the constituency of Hertford and Stortford in 2001. He was promoted from the backbenches to the Opposition frontbench as Shadow Financial Secretary, Shadow Minister for Economic Affairs, an opposition whip and Shadow Minister for Business and Enterprise. He is author of several pamphlets on urban design.

On 26 July 2007, David Cameron appointed Prisk as Shadow Minister for Cornwall, although there was no formal government post for him to shadow. The party said the move was intended to help place the county's concerns "at the heart of Conservative thinking". Cameron said he endorsed the appointment and it would ensure the voice of Cornwall was heard. Liberal Democrat Matthew Taylor claimed the appointment was a bid to get around the rule which requires MPs to limit the local cases they take up to their own constituencies. Prisk defended his role in open letter to the Falmouth Packet, noting "as a born and bred Cornishman" his role was to listen to the concerns of people in Cornwall, feed these back to the Shadow Cabinet and make sure Conservative policies properly reflected the needs of Cornwall.

Prisk was appointed as Minister of State for Business and Enterprise in the Cameron–Clegg coalition, until he was shifted to become Minister of State for Housing and Local Government on 5 September 2012. In this role, he was responsible for creating a "Future High Street Forum" to support struggling High Street retailers, but was asked to step down from the frontbench in an October 2013 reshuffle.

Prisk campaigned to remain in the European Union in the lead-up to the 2016 referendum on Britain's membership and his constituency narrowly voted to remain by 50.76% to 49.24%. However, after the referendum result, he supported the Theresa May's plan for implementation of Britain's withdrawal.

On 9 September 2019, Prisk wrote to the chairman of his local Conservative Association to declare he would not be standing at the next general election.

Personal life
Prisk married Lesley Titcomb, who became CEO at The Pensions Regulator, in April 1989 in Oxfordshire.

Notes

References

External links

 Mark Prisk MP official constituency website

 BBC Politics page 

News articles
 Tories to appoint Cornwall Minister

Video clips
 YouTube page

1962 births
20th-century English businesspeople
Alumni of the University of Reading
British real estate businesspeople
Conservative Party (UK) MPs for English constituencies
English surveyors
Living people
Ministers of State for Housing (UK)
People educated at Truro School
People from Camborne
People from Much Hadham
People from Redruth
UK MPs 2001–2005
UK MPs 2005–2010
UK MPs 2010–2015
UK MPs 2015–2017
UK MPs 2017–2019